Baseball Wives is an American reality television series based around the wives and girlfriends of baseball players from various different teams. The series aired on VH1 and is set in Scottsdale, Arizona, which is primarily home to baseball's spring training of the Cactus League. It was confirmed by Baseball Wives cast member Jordana Lenz that the show had been canceled.

Cast

Main
 Anna Benson, ex-wife of retired Pittsburgh Pirates pitcher Kris Benson
 Brooke Villone, wife of retired Washington Nationals relief pitcher Ron Villone
 Chantel Kendall, ex-wife of retired Kansas City Royals catcher Jason Kendall
 Tanya Grace, ex-wife of retired Chicago Cubs 1B Mark Grace
 Erika Monroe Williams, wife of retired Arizona Diamondbacks 3B Matt Williams
 Jordana Lenz, Dated Milwaukee Brewers outfielder Nyjer Morgan'''

Recurring
 Shayla Farnsworth, wife of Tampa Bay Rays relief pitcher Kyle Farnsworth
 Cheri Knoblauch, ex-wife of retired New York Yankees 2B Chuck Knoblauch
 Maggie McCracken, wife of retired Arizona Diamondbacks outfielder Quinton McCracken

Episodes

References

External links

2010s American reality television series
2011 American television series debuts
2012 American television series endings
VH1 original programming